Portrait of a Man is a c.1660 oil on canvas portrait of an unknown subject by Frans Hals, produced late in his career. Acquired by Édouard André, it is now in the Musée Jacquemart-André in Paris.

References

1660 paintings
Man
Paintings in the collection of the Musée Jacquemart-André
Hals